The ThinkPad T61 is a laptop computer manufactured by Lenovo.

References

External links 
 thinkwiki.de - T61

IBM laptops
Lenovo laptops
ThinkPad